The Pula Arena is a Roman amphitheatre located in Pula, Croatia. It is the only remaining Roman amphitheatre to have four side towers entirely preserved. It was constructed between 27 BC and AD 68, and is among the world's six largest surviving Roman arenas. The arena is also the country's best-preserved ancient monument.

The amphitheatre was depicted on the reverse of the Croatian 10 kuna banknote, issued in 1993, 1995, 2001 and 2004.

History 

The Arena was built between 27 BC and 68 AD, as the city of Pula became a regional centre of Roman rule, called Pietas Julia. The building is named after the sand (Latin harena) that once covered the inner, performance area. It was built outside the town walls along the Via Flavia, the road from Pula to Aquileia and Rome.

The amphitheatre was first built in timber during the reign of Augustus (2–14 AD). It was replaced by a small stone amphitheatre during the reign of emperor Claudius. In 79 AD it was enlarged to accommodate gladiator fights by Vespasian and to be completed in 81 AD under emperor Titus.  This was confirmed by the discovery of a Vespasian coin in the malting.

St. Germanus, of whom little is known, was allegedly tortured in the Amphitheatre in or around 290, and subsequently martyred outside the city, on the road to Nesactium. The legend is apocryphal. The amphitheatre remained in use until the 5th century, when emperor Honorius prohibited gladiatorial combats. It was not until 681 that combat between convicts, particularly those sentenced to death, and wild animals was forbidden. In the 5th century the amphitheatre began to see its stone plundered by the local populace. By the 13th century, the patriarch of Aquileia forbade further removal from the Arena.

Construction 

The exterior wall is constructed in limestone. The part facing the sea consists of three stories, while the other part has only two stories since the amphitheatre was built on a slope. The first two floors have each 72 arches, while the top floor consists of 64 rectangular openings.

It could accommodate 23,000 spectators in the cavea, which had forty steps divided into two meniani. The seats rest directly on the sloping ground; The field for the games, the proper arena, measured . The field was separated from the public by iron gates.

The arena had a total of 15 gates. A series of underground passageways were built underneath the arena along the main axis from which animals, ludi scenes and fighters could be released; stores and shops were located under the raked seating. The amphitheatre was part of the circuit of the gladiators.

Each of the four towers had two cisterns filled with perfumed water that fed a fountain or could be sprinkled on the spectators. The amphitheatre could be covered with velaria (large sails), protecting the spectators from sun or rain (as attested by rare construction elements). Below the arena was a system of canals which collected rainwater and effluent and drained into the sea.

This amphitheatre, through its conservation, has served as an example for the study of ancient building techniques.

Later use
In the Middle Ages the interior of the Arena was often used for grazing, occasional tournaments by the Knights of Malta and medieval fairs. In 1583 the Venetian Senate proposed dismantling the arena and rebuilding it within Venice. The proposals were rejected. Today, a headstone celebrating the Venetian senator  opposition to the plan is currently visible on the second tower.

In 1789, stone was taken from Pula arena for the belfry foundations at Pula Cathedral. This was the last time the arena was used as a source of stone.

Restoration
General Auguste de Marmont, as governor of the Illyrian Provinces during the First French Empire, started the restoration of the arena. This was continued in 1816 by the Ticinese architect Pietro Nobile, commissioned by the emperor Francis I of Austria.

In 1932, the arena was adapted for theatre productions, military ceremonies and public meetings. In its present state, seating capacity is around 7,000 and 12,500 for all standing events.

Present day
The arena is used as a venue for many concerts. Performances have included ones by Foo Fighters, Luciano Pavarotti, Đorđe Balašević, Plácido Domingo, Andrea Bocelli, Patrizio Buanne, Jose Carreras, Dino Merlin, Jamiroquai, Anastacia, Eros Ramazzotti, Maksim Mrvica, Norah Jones, Zucchero, Zdravko Čolić, Alanis Morissette, Sinéad O'Connor, Elton John, 2Cellos, Sting, Michael Bolton, Seal, Il Divo, Tom Jones, Gibonni, Manu Chao, Oliver Dragojević, Leonard Cohen, Grace Jones, Moderat, David Gilmour, Arctic Monkeys and Frank Zivkovic. It has a capacity of about 5000 spectators, and also hosts operas, ballets, sports competitions as well as the Pula Film Festival. The arena is open to the public daily, and the underground passages house exhibitions of viticulture and olive growing in Istria.
 
The arena has also been used for cinematic works such as Titus, a 1999 film adaptation of Shakespeare's revenge tragedy Titus Andronicus by Julie Taymor. On July 8, 2019; a football match was played between the former players of FC Bayern Munich and Croatia national football team as part of a tourism partnership deal between FC Bayern Munich and the Istria Tourist Board signed in 2018. Two professional ice hockey games were played there on September 14 and 16, 2012; KHL Medveščak, a Zagreb-based Erste Bank Eishockey Liga club, hosted HDD Olimpija Ljubljana and the Vienna Capitals.

Panorama

See also
Pula Film Festival

References
 Turner, J., Grove Dictionary of Art, Oxford University Press, USA. New Ed edition, January 2, 1996. .
 Mlakar, Stefan, The Amphitheatre in Pula, The Archaeological Museum of Istra, 1957.

Notes

External links

 Pula Arena in Croatia  – presentation about history of Pula Arena
 Arena (Colliseum) of Pula
 Archaeological Museum of Istria
 A Cravat around an Arena
 Histria Festival 
 Site Romanheritage.com with thousands of photos of Roman Amphitheater at Pula, Croatia, and the rest of the Roman Empire

Arena
60s establishments in the Roman Empire
Buildings and structures completed in the 1st century
Archaeological sites in Croatia
Building projects of the Flavian dynasty
Roman amphitheatres
Ancient Roman buildings and structures in Croatia
Buildings and structures in Pula